Line 2 of Hohhot Metro is a rapid transit line in Hohhot, Inner Mongolia, China.

It was opened on 1 October 2020. The color for Line 2 is blue.

Opening timeline

Stations

References

02
Railway lines opened in 2020
2020 establishments in China